Phenglutarimide (brand names Aturbal and Aturbane) is an anticholinergic used as an antiparkinsonian agent.

References 

Phenyl compounds
Glutarimides
Muscarinic antagonists
Diethylamino compounds